The 2016–17 Nemzeti Bajnokság I, also known as NB I, is the 118th season of top-tier football in Hungary. The league is officially named OTP Bank Liga for sponsorship reasons. Ferencváros were the defending champions having won their twenthy-ninth Hungarian championship last season. As in the previous season, 12 teams compete for the championship title, playing 33 rounds. The fixtures were published on 14 June 2016.

Teams
Puskás Akadémia and Békéscsaba finished the 2015–16 season in the last two places and thus were relegated to NB II division.

The two relegated teams were replaced with the top two teams in 2015–16 NB II, champion Gyirmót and runner-up Mezőkövesd, each having the required licence for top-division play.

Stadium and locations
Following is the list of clubs competing in 2016–17 Nemzeti Bajnokság I, with their location, stadium and stadium capacity.

Notes
Note 1: Diósgyőr's original stadium, Diósgyőri Stadion (1939) was demolished in 2016, while their proposed stadium, Diósgyőri Stadion is under construction. Therefore, Diósgyőr played their home matches in Városi Stadion and Nagyerdei Stadion.
Note 2: Szombathelyi Haladás's original stadium, Rohonci úti Stadion was demolished in 2016, while their proposed stadium, Haladás Sportkomplexum is under construction. Therefore, Haladás played their home matches at the Káposztás utcai Stadion, in Sopron.
Note 3: MTK Budapest FC's original stadium, Hidegkuti Nándor Stadion (1947) was demolished in 2014, while their proposed stadium, Hidegkuti Nándor Stadion was opened on 22 October 2016.
Note 4: Újpest's original stadium, Szusza Ferenc Stadion was renovated.
Note 5: Vasas's original stadium, Illovszky Rudolf Stadion (1960) was demolished, while their proposed stadium, Illovszky Rudolf Stadion is under construction.
Note 6: Videoton's original stadium, Sóstói Stadion (1967) was demolished in 2016, while their proposed stadium, Sóstói Stadion is under construction.

Personnel and kits
Following is the list of clubs competing in 2016–17 Nemzeti Bajnokság I, with their manager, captain, kit manufacturer and shirt sponsor.

Note: Flags indicate national team as has been defined under FIFA eligibility rules. Players and Managers may hold more than one non-FIFA nationality.

Managerial changes

League table

Positions by round

Results
In the first 22 rounds each team plays against every other team home-and-away in a round-robin format. In the remaining 11 rounds, the first six placed teams from the previous season will play six matches at home and five matches away, and the other six teams will play five matches at home and six matches away.

Rounds 1–22

Rounds 23–33

Season statistics

Top goalscorers

Updated to games played on 27 May 2017

‡ Feczesin was transferred to Jeonnam Dragons on 6 January 2017.

Hat-tricks

Attendances

Number of teams by counties 
{| class="wikitable"
|-
!
!colspan=2|County
!No. teams
!Teams
|-
|rowspan=1|1
|align=center|||Budapest (capital)||align=center|5|| Ferencváros, Honvéd, MTK, Újpest and Vasas
|-
|rowspan=1 | 2
|align=center|||Borsod-Abaúj-Zemplén||align=center|2|| Diósgyőr and Mezőkövesd
|-
|rowspan=5|3
|align=center|||Fejér||align=center|1|| Videoton
|-
|align=center|||Győr-Moson-Sopron||align=center|1|| Gyirmót
|-
|align=center|||Hajdú-Bihar||align=center|1|| Debrecen
|-
|align=center|||Tolna||align=center|1|| Paks
|-
|align=center|||Vas||align=center|1|| Haladás

See also
 2016–17 Magyar Kupa
 2017 Magyar Kupa Final
 2016–17 Nemzeti Bajnokság II
 2016–17 Nemzeti Bajnokság III

References

External links
  
 Official rules 
 uefa.com

Nemzeti Bajnokság I seasons
1
Hungary